Edward Still (born 30 December 1990) is a Belgian football manager. He is the current manager Belgian Pro League club of Eupen.

Biography
Still's parents left the United Kingdom for Belgium somewhere around the year 1990. He was raised in English and went to a French school in Walloon Brabant. In football, Still started his career as youth coach at Racing Jet Wavre and Royale Union Rixensartoise. In the meantime, he studied at the Loughborough University, Université catholique de Louvain, KU Leuven and Erasmus University Rotterdam.

In September 2015, he became assistant of Croatian manager Ivan Leko, initially as video-analyst at Sint-Truiden, but thereafter he followed Leko as assistant at Club Brugge. When Leko was coach at Al Ain, Still went on to work as a project manager at Vlerick Business School and as an analyst on the RTBF football talk show La Tribune. In May 2020, Still rejoined Leko's staff at Antwerp, then Shanghai Port in early 2021.

In May 2021, Still returned from China however to start his first job as lead manager, at Charleroi where he succeeded Karim Belhocine.

In November 2022, Still became the manager of Eupen.

Managerial statistics

Personal life
Still has two brothers also active in football, William and Nico (video-analyst).

References

1990 births
Living people
People from Braine-l'Alleud
Belgian football managers
Belgian people of English descent
Royal Antwerp F.C. non-playing staff
R. Charleroi S.C. managers
Belgian expatriate sportspeople in China
Club Brugge KV non-playing staff